Raceway Park has several uses including:

Horse racing
 Raceway Park (Ohio)

Auto racing
Indianapolis Raceway Park
 Houston Raceway Park
 Nebraska Raceway Park
Dells Raceway Park
 Raceway Park (Illinois)
 Raceway Park (Minnesota)
 Old Bridge Township Raceway Park, in Old Bridge, New Jersey
 Rolling Wheels Raceway Park